Forest Dale is an unincorporated village in the town of Brandon, Rutland County, Vermont, United States. Forest Dale has a post office with ZIP code 05733.

Robert Forguites (1938–2019), Vermont politician and businessman, was born in Forest Dale.

Frederick J. Bacon lived in Forest Dale between 1907 and 1914, operating his Bacon Manufacturing and Publishing Company, building banjos.

References

Unincorporated communities in Rutland County, Vermont
Unincorporated communities in Vermont